Greta oto is a species of brush-footed butterfly and member of the subfamily Danainae, tribe Ithomiini, and subtribe Godyridina. It is known by the common name glasswing butterfly for its transparent wings, which allow it to camouflage without extensive coloration. In Spanish-speaking regions, it may also be referred to as espejitos, meaning "little mirrors" because of its transparent wings. The butterfly is mainly found in Central and northern regions of South America, with sightings as far north as Texas and as far south as Chile. While its wings appear delicate, the butterfly is able to carry up to 40 times its own weight. In addition to its wing physiology, the butterfly is known for behaviors such as long migrations and lekking. Greta oto closely resembles Greta andromica.

Geographic range and habitat 
The glasswing butterfly is most commonly found from Central to South America as far south as Chile, with appearances as north as Mexico and Texas. This butterfly thrives in the tropical conditions of the rainforests in the Central and South American countries.

Life cycle

Egg

Eggs are typically laid on plants of the genus Cestrum, a member of the nightshade family of plants, which serves as a food source for later life stages.

Larva

The caterpillars of the glasswing butterfly have green bodies with bright purple and red stripes. They are found on the host plants of genus Cestrum. The larvae are cylindrical in shape with dorsal projections that are smooth with filaments. These properties make the larvae extremely reflective, which essentially causes them to be invisible to predators.

Pupa 

The pupae are silver in colour. During the fifth instar stage, the pupa produces a silk pad on the lower surface of leaves through four spinning movements, onto which it attaches. The silk fibers are important in providing greater flexibility to the pupa attachment. The cremaster, a hooked bristle-like structure on the pupa, attaches to this silk pad by a series of lateral movements of the pupa’s posterior abdomen. Pupa attachment failure occurs when the silk pad breaks. Additionally, researchers have found the pupa attachment to have high tensile strength and toughness, which prevent the pupa from being pulled by predators or breaking off in the wind, allowing them to swing safely.

Adult
The adult glasswing butterfly can be identified by its transparent wings with opaque, dark brown borders tinted with red or orange. Their bodies are a dark brown color.

Food resources

Caterpillar
Poisonous plants of the genus Cestrum provide the best source of nutrition for the caterpillar; experimental studies have shown that when larvae use other host plants, they often die in the first instar stage or develop more slowly. The caterpillars feed on these toxic plants and are perhaps toxic to predators through secondary chemicals stored in their tissues. For example, the caterpillar chemical extracts are unpalatable to Paraponera clavata ants.

Adult
The adult butterfly feeds mainly on the nectar of the flowers of the genus Lantana, which includes 150 species of perennial flowering plants. They also eat flowers in the Asteraceae and Boraginaceae families and the droppings of insectivorous birds, absorbing amino acids that are later converted to proteins. Adult butterflies are also toxic due to the males consuming Asteraceae flowers whose nectar contains pyrrolizidine alkaloids.

Migration

It migrates in order to change elevations, and this migration causes there to be population density differences in varying geographical areas.

Predation
Birds are common predators of this butterfly. The glasswing combats predators by consuming toxins through plants of genus Cestrum and family Asteraceae in both the caterpillar and butterfly stages. Toxin consumption gives the butterfly a foul taste that discourages predation.

Protective coloration

This butterfly uses its transparency to hide from predators by camouflaging into the background during flight. Transparency is a rare trait among Lepidoptera, since they more commonly use mimicry to ward off predators.

Mating

This butterfly species mates polygynously, with males attempting to obtain one or more female mates per breeding season.

Lekking
In order to attract females, male butterflies form leks, or large gatherings where males compete for mates. They gather in shaded areas of the rainforest and competitively display themselves in order to attract mates.

Pheromones
Male glasswing butterflies release pheromones during lekking in order to attract females. The pheromones produced are derived from pyrrolizidine alkaloids that the butterflies obtain through their diet of plants of the family Asteraceae. The alkaloids are then converted to pheromones through the formation of a pyrrole ring, followed by ester cleavage and oxidation. Additionally, since the process by which the pheromone is produced is not only formed by butterflies and moths themselves, but also derived from plants, as with the glasswing butterfly, it is unlikely that the pheromone is used to distinguish between species.

Physiology

Wings

The transparency of Greta oto’s wings results from the combination of several properties: wing material has a low absorption of visible light, there is low scattering of the light that passes through the wings, and there is low reflection of the light impinging on the wing's surface. The latter occurs for a broad range of incident wavelengths, covering the entire visible spectrum, and all incidence angles. This broadband and omnidirectional anti-reflection property originates from nanopillars standing on the wing's surface which ensures a gradient of refractive index between the incident medium, air, and the wing's membrane. These nanopillars, non-periodically arranged on the wing's surface, possess a high aspect ratio (defined as height divided by radius), where the radii are below the wavelengths of the visible light. Additionally, they feature a random height and width distribution, which is directly responsible for the smooth refractive index gradient and thereby for the broadband and omnidirectional anti-reflection properties. These properties are further improved by the presence of pedestals at the base of the nanopillars. Additionally, the structure of the nanopillars allows for the wings to have a low roughness factor because of its tiny hair-like microtrichia features. This was experimentally tested through water droplet adhesion to the wings. Basically, it reflects light and is transparent because of nanopillars that make up the wing.

Conservation
The following national parks of Costa Rica currently feature the glasswing butterfly and are working on their conservation: Guanacaste National Park, Rincón de la Vieja National Park, Monteverde Cloud Forest Reserve, Palo Verde National Park, Carara National Park, Poás Volcano National Park, La Selva Reserve and Biological Station, Juan Castro Blanco National Park, Irazú Volcano National Park, Chirripó National Park, and La Amistad International Park.

References

Ithomiini
Butterflies of Central America
Nymphalidae of South America
Lepidoptera of Colombia
Butterflies of North America
Butterflies described in 1854